Mactabene Amachree (born 30 January 1978 in Port Harcourt) is a former Nigerian professional basketball player. In 2001, she became the first Nigerian to play in the WNBA.  Amachree played on the Nigeria women's national basketball team in the 2004 Summer Olympics. She is also the princess of the Ojuka Clan of the Kalabari people in Nigeria.

Notes

1978 births
Living people
Olympic basketball players of Nigeria
Basketball players at the 2004 Summer Olympics
Abilene Christian University alumni
Nigerian expatriate basketball people in the United States
Nigerian women's basketball players
Beşiktaş women's basketball players
Sportspeople from Port Harcourt
African Games gold medalists for Nigeria
African Games medalists in basketball
Competitors at the 2003 All-Africa Games
Forwards (basketball)